The 2009–10 UCI Track Cycling World Ranking is an overview of the UCI Track Cycling World Ranking, based upon the results in all UCI-sanctioned track cycling races of the 2009–10 track cycling season.

Summary

Sources

Individual pursuit

Points race

Scratch

Sprint

Time trial

Keirin

Team pursuit

Team sprint

Madison

See also

 2009 UCI Women's Road World Rankings
 2010 UCI Women's Road World Rankings

References

2009 in track cycling
2010 in track cycling
UCI Track Cycling World Ranking